Porucznik (Por.) is a rank of the Polish Army, roughly equivalent to the military rank of the First Lieutenant in the armed forces of other countries. In the Polish Army, a Porucznik is included in the corps of junior officers. The rank directly under is Podporucznik (ppor.), which is equivalent to most nations' Second Lieutenant. The rank directly above is Kapitan, which is equivalent to captain.  A Polish officer with the rank of lieutenant will wear three stars on their shoulder straps.  

Currently, in the Polish Army, professional officers with the rank of Porucznik mainly serve as heads and officers of battalion and squadron staff sections. They also commonly serve as deputy company and battery commanders.    

The rank of lieutenant is also present in Poland's Border Guard, Prison Service, Government Protection Bureau, Foreign Intelligence Agency, Military Intelligence Service, Military Counterintelligence Service, and Internal Security Agency. The equivalent of this rank in the police is a commissioner, in the State Fire Service - a captain, and in the Customs Service - a customs commissioner.

Eptymology 
"Porucznik" is derived from the verb "poruać" that occurs in Old Polish, that is, "to put into one's hands with confidence, to entrust", which in turn is derived from the word "hand". Originally, the word "Porucznik" had a more general meaning.

Military ranks of Poland

pl:Porucznik